Polychlorinated naphthalene (PCN) are the products obtained upon treatment of naphthalene with chlorine. The generic chemical formula is C10H8−(m+n)Cl(m+n).  Commercial PCNs are mixtures of up to 75 components and byproducts. The material is an oil or a waxy solid, depending on the degree of chlorination. PCNs were once used in insulating coatings for electrical wires, as well as other applications, but their use has been largely phased out.

Chemical structure of PCN congeners

There are 75 different PCN congeners.

Production
PCNs started to be produced for high-volume uses around 1910 in both Europe and the United States. In Europe the largest volume products were called Nibren waxes, made in Germany by Bayer. Other European PCN tradenames included Seekay (UK, from ICI), Clonacire (France), Cerifal (Italy) and Woskol (Poland). In the United States, the largest volume PCN products were called Halowax, from a New York company of the same name that was later owned by Union Carbide and then taken over by Koppers of Pittsburgh, PA, now Beazer East. Although trace amounts of PCNs may be released by natural processes such as wildfires, their industrial uses increased the apparent rates of accumulation in the environment by factors of 10,000 or more.

Safety
After about 20 years of commercial production, health hazards began to be reported in workers exposed to PCNs: chloracne,  severe skin rashes and liver disease that led to deaths of workers. A conference about the hazards was organized at Harvard School of Public Health in 1937, and several more publications dealing with PCN hazards appeared before 1940.  PCNs containing three or more chlorines per molecule have typically been found more hazardous than those with fewer, but as the maximum of eight is approached, hazards appear to decrease.

There was a lag of about 40 years between disclosure of PCN hazards and government regulation. In the U.S. exposure to PCNs was drastically reduced after 1976, following enactment of the Toxic Substances Control Act. Major equipment manufacturers banned PCNs in their products, and major PCN producers discontinued operations. By 1983 worldwide PCN production had almost halted except for small amounts used in testing and research. Until recent years duPont produced a synthetic rubber, Neoprene FB, made in Northern Ireland using pentachloronaphthalene. 

Increased cancer risks have been suspected but so far not shown. Current concerns about PCNs include their release as byproducts of waste incineration.

Bioaccumulation
In 2013, the 9th meeting of the Persistent Organic Pollutants Review Committee, established under the Stockholm Convention on Persistent Organic Pollutants proposed di-,tri-,tetra-,penta-,hexa-, hepta- and octa-chlorinated napthalenes, for listing in Annexes A and C to that Convention.

While some PCNs can be broken down by sunlight and, at slow rates, by certain microorganisms, many PCNs persist in the environment. After more than 80 years of use and total production of several hundred thousand tons, PCN residues are widespread.

See also
1-Chloronaphthalene
2-Chloronaphthalene

References

Literature 
 Eva Jakobsson, Lillemor Asplund: Polychlorinated Naphthalenes (PCNs), in The Handbook of Environmental Chemistry, Volume 3K, 2000, p. 97–126, 

Chloroarenes
Naphthalenes
Persistent organic pollutants under the Stockholm Convention